Zach Dockar-Clay (born 24 April 1995) is a New Zealand professional rugby league footballer who plays as a  or  for the North Sydney Bears in the NSW Cup. 

He previously played for the Canterbury-Bankstown Bulldogs in the NRL. He also played for Hull Kingston Rovers in the RFL Championship and Super League Qualifiers.

Early life
Born in New Plymouth, New Zealand, Dockar-Clay is of Māori descent (from the Ngāti Porou and Te Āti Awa iwi). He is the great-grandson of Great Britain and England rugby league representative Alec Dockar.

He played his junior rugby league for the Bell Block Marist Dragons.

Playing career

Parramatta Eels
Dockar-Clay played 78 games for the Parramatta Eels in the National Youth Competition from 2012 to 2015, scoring 34 tries, kicking 40 goals and 1 field goal. Dockar-Clay represented the Junior Kiwis on three occasions between 2013 and 2015, captaining the team in 2015. In June 2015, he signed a contract with the Penrith Panthers starting in 2016.

Penrith Panthers
In February 2016, Dockar-Clay was selected as a member of the Panthers' squad for the 2016 Auckland Nines pre-season tournament. He captained Penrith's New South Wales Cup team throughout 2016. On 15 October 2016, Dockar-Clay represented the New Zealand Māori against the New Zealand Residents. In February 2017, Dockar-Clay was selected to play in the 2017 Auckland Nines. In March 2017, he signed with Hull Kingston Rovers until the end of 2018, effective immediately.

Hull KR
Dockar-Clay made his professional rugby league debut for Hull KR on 10 April 2017 against the Swinton Lions, scoring a try. He played 19 games in his first season at the club, scoring 6 tries and kicking 10 goals.

Townsville Blackhawks
In November 2017, after helping Hull KR to gain promotion to the Super League, Dockar-Clay was granted an early release from his contract and returned to Australia, signing with the Townsville Blackhawks for the 2018 season.

Blacktown Workers
In 2019, Dockar-Clay signed a contract to join Manly Cup NSW side the Blacktown Workers Sea Eagles.

Western Suburbs
In 2021, he signed for NSW Cup side Western Suburbs.

Canterbury-Bankstown Bulldogs
In 2022, Dockar-Clay signed for Canterbury. Dockar-Clay spent the start of the season playing for the clubs NSW Cup side.  In round 11 of the 2022 NRL season, he made his NRL debut against the Wests Tigers at Leichhardt Oval.
Dockar-Clay made a total of 14 appearances for Canterbury throughout the 2022 season which were all from the interchange bench. The club would finish 12th on the table and miss the finals.

North Sydney
In November 2022, Dockar-Clay signed a contract to join NSW Cup side North Sydney ahead of the 2023 season.

References

External links
Hull Kingston Rovers profile

1995 births
Living people
Blacktown Workers players
Hull Kingston Rovers players
Canterbury-Bankstown Bulldogs players
Junior Kiwis players
New Zealand Māori rugby league players
New Zealand people of English descent
New Zealand rugby league players
Rugby league halfbacks
Rugby league hookers
Rugby league players from New Plymouth
Townsville Blackhawks players
Western Suburbs Magpies NSW Cup players